For the Autonomy (PlA) is a centrist political party active in Aosta Valley, Italy.

The party was launched in August 2020 as a split from the Valdostan Union (UV). The effort was led by Augusto Rollandin, who had formally and informally led the UV for virtually 40 years and had been President of Aosta Valley in 1984–1990 and 2008–2017, as well as senator representing the region in 2001–2006. Another leading member was Marco Carrel, a former leader of the UV's youth organisation.

In the 2020 regional election, the party won 6.4% of the vote and 3 seats in the Regional Council.

After being opposed to the government led by UV leader Erik Lavévaz, in March 2023 PlA joined the government led by UV's Renzo Testolin, along with the Democratic Party (PD), the Valdostan Alliance (AV), Edelweiss (SA) and Mouv'.

References

External links
Official website

Political parties in Aosta Valley
Political parties established in 2020
2020 establishments in Italy